Claude Ponsard (1927–1990) was a French economist who worked in spatial economics and in the application of fuzzy set theory to economics. Bo Yuan and George J. Klir noted that Ponsard was a "pioneer who initiated the reformulation of economic theory by taking advantage of fuzzy set theory" in their book, Fuzzy sets and fuzzy logic theory and applications (1995).

Publications

References

1927 births
1990 deaths
Regional economists
20th-century  French economists
20th-century French male writers